Fatih Avan (born 1 January 1989) is a male Turkish javelin thrower.

Career
Avan participated at the 2009 Mediterranean Games in Pescara, Italy and won the gold medal with a personal best throw of 79.78 m. At the 9th European Winter Throwing Cup held on 14 March 2009 in Los Realejos on Tenerife, Spain, he ranked third throwing the javelin 74.82 m.

Avan is broke the Turkish record with a mark of 77.15 m in June 2009 in Bursa. He represented Turkey at the 2009 World Championships in Athletics, but did not make it past the qualifying round.

In 2011 he improved his Turkish record to 81.16 m, clearing the eighty-metre mark for the first time, and the performance brought him the under-23 gold at the 2011 European Cup Winter Throwing.

In 2011 he improved his Turkish record to 84.11 m, and won silver medal at the 2011 European Athletics U23 Championships in Ostrava, Czech Republic.

He set a new national record with 85.60 m at the Turkish Super League held on 20 May 2012 in Izmir. The former record belonged also him with 84.79 m. Avan was qualified before to participate at the 2012 Summer Olympics.

He won the silver medal at the 2013 Islamic Solidarity Games held in Palembang, Indonesia.

Achievements

Seasonal bests by year
2008 – 71.73
2009 – 79.78
2010 – 79.13
2011 – 84.79
2012 – 85.60
2013 – 84.58
2014 – 83.05
2015 – 81.45

References

External links
 

1989 births
Living people
Turkish male javelin throwers
Fenerbahçe athletes
People from Andırın
Olympic athletes of Turkey
Athletes (track and field) at the 2012 Summer Olympics
Mediterranean Games gold medalists for Turkey
Athletes (track and field) at the 2013 Mediterranean Games
Universiade medalists in athletics (track and field)
Athletes (track and field) at the 2018 Mediterranean Games
Mediterranean Games medalists in athletics
Universiade gold medalists for Turkey
Universiade bronze medalists for Turkey
Competitors at the 2009 Summer Universiade
Medalists at the 2011 Summer Universiade
Medalists at the 2013 Summer Universiade
Islamic Solidarity Games medalists in athletics
Islamic Solidarity Games competitors for Turkey
21st-century Turkish people